Graureihersee is a lake in Saxony, Germany. Its surface area is 1.38 km².

Lakes of Saxony